Tierney  is an Irish surname.

It is an Anglicized form of  Irish  (male),  (female), also spelt /. It is derived from tiarna, the Irish word for Lord or Master. The name can be found around the world, mostly in the Anglosphere and it's most prevalent outside of Ireland in the United Kingdom and United States of America.

Five unrelated families of the name arose in Gaelic Ireland, in what is now County Clare, County Mayo, County Monaghan, County Meath, and County Tipperary.

Families

Ó Tighearnaigh of Cenél nEógain
This family lived in the territory of Fearnmuigh or Fearnmaigh [which means 'the territory of the plain'], in an area in South Monaghan/South Armagh that is the present Barony of Farney, whose principal town is Carrickmacross.

Ó Tighearnaigh of Uí Fiachrach Muaidhe
This family were Lords of Carra. Almost the only family member recorded in the annals was Flann Ó Tighearnaigh. Gilbert Ó Tigernaig, Bishop of Annaghdown (1306–1323), was also a member of this family.

Ó Tighearnaigh of Brega
This family claimed descent from Tigernach mac Fócartai (died 865), one of the Kings of Brega. They were a branch of the southern Uí Néill. "The Kingdom is said to have stretched from Birr in County Offaly to the Hill of Uishneach in Westmeath. Tighearnach resided at the Great Crannóg of Lagore, which is situated near Ratoath in County Meath, not far from Dublin. Tighearnach led the Irish to a great victory over the Norse Vikings in 848 A.D."

Ó Tighearnaigh of Ormond
A family of the name resided in Ormond, now County Tipperary. Their origins are obscure. New research now confirms that this family was indeed an indigenous sept. Their seat was in the townland of Park and their lands, Fearann Ó Tighearnaigh, took in most of the present-day townlands of Ballymackey, Ballyknockane, Carrowea, Clash, Falleen, Gortnadrumman, Kilgorteen and Knockane.

Ó Tighearnaigh of Corcu Modruad
This is an area in northern County Clare. This sept were hereditary priests and monks.

People

In arts and media
Brian Tierney (medievalist) (1922–2019), historian and medievalist
 Mark Aloysius Tierney (1795–1862), English Catholic historian
 Patrick Lennox Tierney (1914–2015), art historian, specialist on Japan
 Tom Tierney (artist) (1928–2014), American paper doll artist

Film, television, and theatre
 Eileen Wilson Powell (1894-1942) American actress born Julia Mary Tierney 
 Gene Tierney (1920–1991), American stage and film actress
 Gerard "Jerry" Tierney (1924–1985), American actor known as Scott Brady
 Jacob Tierney (born 1979), Canadian actor, film director and writer
 Kevin Tierney (1950–2018), Canadian film producer
 Lawrence Tierney (1919–2002), Irish-American actor
 Malcolm Tierney (1938–2014), British actor
 Maura Tierney (born 1965), American actress

In music
 Andrew Tierney (born 1974), Australian singer-songwriter of band Human nature
 Garrett Tierney bass guitar and vocals in band 'brand new'
 Harry Tierney (1890–1965), American composer of musical theatre
 Michael Tierney (musician) (born 1977), member of Australian band Human Nature
 Mick Pyro, Irish musician, born Michael Tierney
 Vivian Tierney (born 1957), English operatic soprano

In other media
 Gerard Tierney (1924–1979), Irish bi-lingual radio broadcaster
 John Tierney (journalist) (born 1953), American journalist
 Matthew Tierney (born 1970), Canadian poet
 Patrick Tierney (journalist), volunteer at the University of Pittsburgh
 Richard L. Tierney (born 1936), American writer
 Robert J. Tierney, linguist and author
 Ronald Tierney (1944–2017), American newspaper editor and author
 Tierney Gearon (born 1963), American photographer

Government, law, and politics
 Darren Tierney, British civil servant, Director General for Propriety and Ethics
 Frank A. Tierney, Deputy Commissioner under the Workmen's Compensation act
 Gayle Tierney Australian politician, labor party
 George Tierney (1761–1830), English Whig politician
 James Tierney (politician) (born 1947), Attorney General of Maine
 John Tierney (Australian politician) (born 1946), Liberal senator
 John Tierney (Irish politician) (born 1951)
 John F. Tierney (born 1951), United States Representative from Massachusetts 
 John H. Tierney (1832–1907), American politician and farmer
 John J. Tierney (1926–2005), American Boston city council member
 Joseph M. Tierney (1941–2009), American politician, father of Maura Tierney
 Michael Tierney (politician) (1894–1975), professor at University College Dublin
 Patrick Tierney (Irish politician) (1904–1990), Irish Labour party politician
 Peter Tierney Murrell (born 1964), CEO of the Scottish National Party
 Susan Tierney (born 1951), American academic and Government policy administrator
 Sydney Tierney (1923–2010), British Labour Party politician
 Thomas Tierney (1916–1998), Irish mayor of Galway, Ireland  
 Thomas M. Tierney (1919–2001), American administrator of the Bureau of Health Insurance
 Tim Tierney (born 1974), Canadian councillor and politician
 William Tierney Robarts (1786–1820), British politician and businessman
 William L. Tierney (1876–1958), Democratic member of the US House of Representatives

In sport

In Football 
 Chris Tierney (soccer) (born 1986), American footballer
 Francis Tierney (born 1975), English footballer with Doncaster Rovers
 Gary Tierney (born 1986), Scottish football (soccer) player
 Grant Tierney  (born 1961), Scottish footballer
 Jim Tierney (footballer) (born 1940), Scottish footballer
 Kieran Tierney (born 1997), footballer for Celtic Glasgow, Arsenal
 Lawrie Tierney (1959–2011), Scottish football (soccer) player
 Marc Tierney (born 1985), English footballer (soccer)
 Martin Tierney (born 1966), Scottish footballer (Ayr United) and TV pundit
 Neil Tierney, Australian rugby league footballer
 Paul Tierney (footballer) (born 1982 in England), Irish football (soccer) player
 Ross Tierney (born 2001) Irish footballer
 Ryan Tierney, Scottish footballer
 Sam Tierney (born 1998), English footballer for Leicester City
 Tommy Tierney, English footballer

In Gaelic Football
 Benny Tierney, Irish Gaelic goalkeeper and sports journalist
 David Tierney (born 1979), Irish hurler and Gaelic footballer
 John Tierney (Gaelic footballer) (born 1982), Gaelic footballer
 Matthew Tierney (Gaelic footballer) Irish Gaelic footballer
 Michael Tierney (Gaelic footballer) (born 1986), from Laois in Ireland
 Noel Tierney (born 1942), Irish Gaelic footballer and sportsperson
 Tomás Tierney (born 1961), Irish Gaelic footballer

In Rugby
Dylan Tierney-Martin (born 1999), Irish rugby union player
Lewis Tierney (born 1994), Scottish international rugby league player
Matt Tierney (born 1996), Canadian Rugby union player
Melbourne Tierney (born 1924), Welsh rugby league player
Paul Tierney (rugby league) (1919–1973), Australian rugby league footballer
Tom Tierney (rugby union), Irish rugby union player

In other sports
 Bill Tierney (baseball) (1858–1898), with Cincinnati red stockings
 Chris Tierney (ice hockey) (born 1994), Canadian hockey player
 Cotton Tierney (1894–1953), American baseball second and third baseman
 Erin Tierney (born 1970), Cook Islander female Olympic sprinter
 Festus Tierney (1899–1973), American NFL guard with Toledo Maroons
 Jack Tierney (1893–1968), American basketball player and coach
 Jade Tierney (born 2004), Cook Islander Olympic canoeist
 James Tierney (footballer) (1878–1959), Australian rules footballer
 Joe Tierney (1903–2004), American sprinter at the 1928 Olympics
 John Tierney (cricketer) (born 1964), English cricketer
 John Tierney (rower), American rower
 Meghan Tierney, US Olympic snowboarder
 Paul Tierney (hurler) (born 1982), Irish hurler and ultrarunner
 Shea Tierney (born 1986), American football and coach for New York giants
 Tim Tierney (American football) (1943–2012) American football player and coach
 Tom Tierney (hurler) (1894–1984), Irish hurler 
 Trevor Tierney American Lacrosse goaltender and coach
 Bill Tierney, lacrosse coach

Other fields

In Business
 Brian Tierney (born 1957), American businessman and newspaper publisher
 Michael Tierney (born 1989), American businessman, founder of Stuffed Puffs
 Paul E. Tierney (born 1943), American business professor and venture capitalist
 Thomas J. Tierney (born 1954), business executive, chairman of eBay

In Education
 Alison J. Tierney CBE (born 1948), British nursing theorist and researcher
 Charles Rust-Tierney (born 1955), American ACLU chapter president
 James Tierney (politician) (born 1947), Attorney General of Maine
 Keith Tierney Canadian scientist and academic
 Myles Tierney (1937–2017), American mathematician and professor
 Robert J. Tierney, Dean Emeritus at the University of British Columbia
 T. F. Tierney (born 1951), American urbanist, network theorist and educator
 William G. Tierney, American scholar in higher education and Author

Other 
 Emiko Ohnuki-Tierney (born 1934), Japanese-American anthropologist
 Flann Ó Tighearnaigh (died 1273), Gaelic Irish lord
 John P. Tierney (1974–2001), one of Emergency workers killed in the September 11 attacks
 Paul Tierney (referee) (born 1980), English football referee
 Tigernach mac Fócartai (died 865), king of Lagore
 William Tierney Clark (1783–1852), English civil engineer of bridges

In Religion
 Cornelius Tierney (1872–1931), Irish priest and missionary
 Gilbert Ó Tigernaig, bishop of Annaghdown
 Michael Tierney (bishop) (1839–1908), Roman Catholic bishop
 Tigernach of Clones (died 549), Irish saint, patron
 Tigernach Ua Braín (died 1088), Abbott of Clonmacnoise

In Science
 James Edward Tierney Aitchison (1835–1898), Scottish surgeon and botanist
 Jessica Tierney (born 1982), American paleoclimatologist
 Luke Tierney, American statistician and computer scientist
 Matthew John Tierney (1776–1845), Irish surgeon and royal physician

Fictional Characters
 Kyra Tierney, character in the video game Phantasy Star IV
 Philip Tierney, main protagonist in the 1958 film Terror in the Haunted House
 Rashers Tierney in TV show Strumpet City (miniseries) played by David Kelly 
 Ray Tierney, main protagonist in Pride and Glory (film) played by Edward Norton
 Sheila Wayne Tierney, main protagonist in the 1958 film Terror in the Haunted House
 Skye Tierney, character in the Evernight (series) books
 Jack Tierney, character in the film Friday the 13th.

References

See also
 Lawvere–Tierney topology
 Roper-Logan-Tierney model of nursing (published 1980, revised in 1985, 1990 and latest edition 1998)
 Simmons–Tierney bet
 Tigernach (disambiguation)

Irish families
Patronymic surnames
Surnames of Irish origin
Anglicised Irish-language surnames